David Wagner and Nicholas Taylor defeated the two-time defending champion Andrew Lapthorne and his partner Anders Hard in the final, 6–2, 6–3 to win the quad doubles wheelchair tennis title at the 2013 Australian Open.

Lapthorne and Peter Norfolk were the two-time reigning champions, but Norfolk did not participate.

Seeds
  David Wagner /  Nicholas Taylor (champions)
  Andrew Lapthorne /  Anders Hard (final)

Main draw

Final

References
 Main Draw

Wheelchair Quad Doubles
2013 Quad Doubles